Zeuzerobotys is a monotypic moth genus of the family Crambidae described by Eugene G. Munroe in 1963. Its only species, Zeuzerobotys mirabilis, described by the same author in the same year, is found in Hidalgo, Mexico.

References

Spilomelinae
Taxa named by Eugene G. Munroe
Crambidae genera
Monotypic moth genera